The Dartmouth Big Green represented Dartmouth College in ECAC women's ice hockey. The Big Green will attempt to win the NCAA tournament for the first time in school history.

Offseason

Recruiting

Regular season

Standings

Schedule

Conference record

Roster

Awards and honors
Ailish Forfar, ECAC Rookie of the Week (Week of January 7, 2013)

References

Dartmouth Big Green women's ice hockey seasons
Dartmouth
Big
Big